Stephen Robert Kuta (ˈkʉːˌta) is a British author, poet, historian, and genealogist based in the UK. He has published several books and poetry anthologies.

Published works

He published selected prose and poetry in several anthologies in the 1990s, including works within the publications; Moments in the Garden A Few Precious Thoughts and A Quite Storm. He has been recognised by the Sunday Mirror newspaper for his prose written in remembrance of Diana, Princess of Wales, and published within The Sunday Mirror, September 14, 1997, (Princess Diana Commemorative edition).

In 2005, Kuta edited and published a limited edition book which was intended to bring together voices from around the world as a response to the tragic tsunami on Boxing Day 2004. Paint the Sky with Stars features a collection of poetry written by people affected by the Tsunami which caused so much damage in South East Asia. People from all sectors of society contributed to the anthology and the poetry is unique and reflective of the poets' thoughts surrounding this devastating natural disaster. All of the proceeds generated by the publication were donated to the Tsunami Earthquake Fund, and this book is now highly regarded as a valuable insight into social history. It is studied during several university degree courses.  
In 2018, he published his first selected works in the anthology Once I Write of Love.

The book, My Life in Pictures is a photographic portfolio published in 2018. an autobiographical photo-biography which covers the life of a gay man over a period of four decades. The Images include a range of self-portraits and professional shots, which were taken by Men Art. Much of the content of the book specifically focuses on LGBT Art, Stephen is an advocate for Gay rights and has supported the LGBT Community at pride events in Brighton, London and Manchester. Kuta was also the first Gay man in Essex, England to commit to a civil partnership in January 2006, just six weeks after it became legal to do so in December 2005.

Bibliography
(2005). Paint the Sky With Stars: Selected Poetry in Remembrance of the Boxing Day Tsunami 2004. Re-invention UK LTD. .
(2018). My Life in Pictures (1978 - 2018). Blurb, Incorporated. .
(2018). Mrs Mary Plaskett 1739 - 1827. Blurb, Incorporated. .
(2018). Once I Write of Love: Selected Poetry and Prose. Blurb Inc & distributed by Loma Publishing. .
(2018). Selina's Letter, Tales of Suicide from Victorian and Edwardian London. Loma Publishing. .
(2018). War and Verse, Poetry and Prose of World War One as seen in the wartime press. Re-invention UK. .
(2019). Cape Town. Blurb, Incorporated. .
(2019). Semper Fidelis, The Lwów Eaglets. Loma Publishing. .
(2019). Life in Monochrome, Poetry and Prose. Re-invention UK. .
(2019). For God's sake hold your tongue, and let me love, Selected Poetry and prose and Biography of John Donne. Loma Publishing. ASIN B07SRWNKGH.
(2019). True Colours, The Beauty and Colour of Gay Pride (2008 - 2018). Black and Kuta Press. ASIN B07TZCH72F.
(2019). Jubilee - London Pride 2019. Black and Kuta Press. 
(2020). Stormforge, Lightning Strikes on Seadragon Wings - Book One - The Jarl of Møre. Loma Publishing. 
(2020). The Horsemen of the Apocalypse. Re-invention UK. 
(2020). Stormforge, Lightning Strikes on Seadragon Wings - Book Two - The Duke of Normandy. Loma Publishing.

References 

Living people
British poets
1978 births